Palmer Creek is a stream in Iron County in the U.S. state of Missouri. It is a tributary of Big Creek.

The stream flows generally east for approximately two miles to its confluence with Big River south of Royal Gorge and adjacent to Missouri routes 72 and 21.

Palmer Creek the name Parmer is a corruption of Parmer, the surname of a pioneer citizen.

See also
List of rivers of Missouri

References

Rivers of Iron County, Missouri
Rivers of Missouri